The Coiba Island howler (Alouatta coibensis) is a type of howler monkey, a type of New World monkey, endemic to Panama. Although the Coiba Island howler has been recognized as a separate species by a number of authorities since a 1987 study of its fingerprints, mitochondrial DNA testing found it does not differ from mantled howler populations in any significant way. A reason given for treating it as a separate species is that the dermal ridges of its hands and feet differ from those of the mantled howler.

A. c. coibensis is smaller than other Central American howler monkeys and has duller pelage than the Azuero howler, Alouatta coibensis trabeata.

Subspecies
Two subspecies of this howler have been recognized by those who consider it a separate species:
Alouatta coibensis coibensis Thomas, 1902, found on Coiba Island and Jicaron, off the Pacific coast of Panama
Azuero howler, A. c. trabeata Lawrence, 1933, endemic to the Azuero Peninsula in Panama.

References

External links

Howler monkeys
Howler, Coiba Island
Mammals described in 1902
Taxa named by Oldfield Thomas
Taxobox binomials not recognized by IUCN